Microsoft Write is a basic word processor included with Windows 1.0 and later, until Windows NT 3.51. Throughout its lifespan it was minimally updated, and is comparable to early versions of MacWrite. Early versions of Write only work with Write Document (.wri) files, which are a subset of the Rich Text Format (RTF). After Windows 3.0, Write became capable of reading and composing early Word Document (.doc) files. With Windows 3.1, Write became OLE capable. In Windows 95, Write was replaced with WordPad; attempting to open Write from the Windows folder will open WordPad instead.

Being a word processor, Write features additional document formatting features that are not found in Notepad (a simple text editor), such as a choice of font, text decorations and paragraph indentation for different parts of the document. Unlike versions of WordPad before Windows 7, Write could justify a paragraph.

Platforms

Atari ST 
In 1986, Atari announced an agreement with Microsoft to bring Microsoft Write to the Atari ST.

Unlike the Windows version, Microsoft Write for the Atari ST is the Atari version of Microsoft Word 1.05 released for the Apple Macintosh while sharing the same name as the program included with Microsoft Windows during the 80s and early 90s.  While the program was announced in 1986, various delays caused the program to arrive in 1988.  The Atari version is a one time release and was never updated.

Microsoft Write for the Atari ST retailed at $129.95 and is one of two high-profile PC word processors that were released on the Atari platform. The other application is WordPerfect.

Macintosh 
In October 1987, Microsoft released Microsoft Write for Macintosh. Write is a version of Microsoft Word with limited features that Microsoft hoped would replace aging MacWrite in the Macintosh word processor market. Write was priced well below Word, though at the time MacWrite was included with new Macintoshes. Write is best described as Word locked in "Short Menus" mode, and as such it used the same file format so that users could exchange files with absolutely no conversion necessary. Write did not sell well and was discontinued before the System 7 era. Microsoft Write was part of a short-lived trend for "lightweight" Macintosh word processors initiated by the introduction of the Macintosh Portable and early PowerBook systems. Others included LetterPerfect and Nisus Compact.

Microsoft Windows 
In 1985, Windows 1.0 was released with Microsoft Write. This version is a basic word processor, intended to be more complex than Notepad. It is very similar to the Macintosh version, and has all of the same features. It saves to Write Document (.wri) format, which is a subset of today's Rich Text Format (RTF). Later versions can save to the Word Document (.doc) format. Starting with Windows 95, WordPad replaces Microsoft Write. Because the Write Document format is a subset of RTF, WordPad can read them but cannot write them.

The executable for Microsoft Write still remains in Windows, however it is simply a compatibility stub that launches WordPad.

References 

1985 software
Atari ST software
Discontinued Windows components
Write
Windows word processors